Sybistroma is a genus of flies in the family Dolichopodidae. It includes over 50 species, described mainly from the Palaearctic and Oriental realms. A single species is known from the Afrotropical realm. Until 2005, the genus was thought to be restricted to the Mediterranean in distribution, with five known species. It was recently expanded to include the former genera Hypophyllus, Ludovicius and Nordicornis, as well as some species of Hercostomus.

Species
The following species are included in the genus:

Notes

References

Dolichopodidae genera
Dolichopodinae
Diptera of Asia
Taxa named by Johann Wilhelm Meigen